Rogue is a 2007 Australian independent horror film written, produced and directed by Greg McLean, about a group of tourists in Australia who fall prey to a giant,  man-eating crocodile. It stars Radha Mitchell, Michael Vartan, and Sam Worthington.

The film was inspired by the true story of Sweetheart, a giant male saltwater crocodile that attacked boats in the late 1970s, although Sweetheart was never responsible for an attack on a human. Rogue received positive reviews from critics, but was a commercial failure.

It is the second and last film from Dimension Films to have the involvement of Village Roadshow Pictures, the other being 1992's Fortress.

Plot

American travel journalist Pete McKell (Michael Vartan) joins a small group of tourists on a crocodile-watching river cruise in Kakadu National Park of Australia's Northern Territory, led by wildlife researcher Kate Ryan (Radha Mitchell). Toward the end of the cruise, Everett (Robert Taylor) spots a flare in the distance and the group head upriver to investigate. They eventually come across a half-sunken wreck when something crashes into their boat, splitting the side.

Kate manages to steer the boat ashore a small island in the middle of the river. Kate realises they are in the crocodile's territory and explains they must leave the island by nightfall, as the tide will start to rise and the island will be submerged. Moments after, Everett is pulled into the water by an unseen predator and is killed. Two locals, Neil (Sam Worthington) and Collin (Damien Richardson), arrive at the island but the beast upturns their boat; Neil swims to the island while Collin is killed.

As night falls, Neil carefully swims to the riverbank in order to string a rope between two trees, creating a zip-line to allow the group to cross the river. Everett's wife Mary Ellen (Caroline Brazier) crosses first, only to freeze in fear halfway across. Allen (Geoff Morrell), becoming impatient and aggressive, attempts to get himself and his daughter Sherry (Mia Wasikowska) across with Mary Ellen still on the line. While trying to secure the rope, Neil is attacked and killed by the beast. The tree holding the rope breaks and the three on the line fall into the water. They manage to swim back to the island, but as Allen crawls up the shore, the beast lunges out of the water and throws him back into the river, where he is dragged under.

Later that night, Pete suggests hooking the beast while everyone else swims to the riverbank; Neil's two dead birds replace Kate's dog named Kevin, the initial bait idea. After a long wait, the anchor is suddenly pulled and the group make a break for the far shore. The beast eventually lets go of the bait, seizes Kate and drags her underwater. Pete hurries across the river with Kevin in tow and into the bush behind the others.

As day breaks, Pete is forced to chase Kevin into the bush after he runs off. He falls down a narrow chute into a large cave, where he discovers Neil's partial corpse. The cave is the beast's lair and the dog leads him to a badly injured Kate. Pete attempts to carry her out but Kevin runs off to the head of the cave, where it is heard being seized by the beast. After several attempts on them both, the beast takes a chunk out of Pete's hand. Pete eventually props a large broken log against a boulder, with the sharp end pointing outwards, so when the beast lunges at him, it is impaled and dies. Pete escapes from the cave with Kate and finds the tourists and paramedics.

As the credits roll, the camera focuses on a newspaper article detailing Pete's heroic battle with the beast and rescue of Kate.

Cast

Michael Vartan as Pete McKell
Radha Mitchell as Kate Ryan
Sam Worthington as Neil Kelly
Caroline Brazier as Mary Ellen
Stephen Curry as Simon
Celia Ireland as Gwen
John Jarratt as Russell
Damien Richardson as Collin
Robert Taylor as Everett Kennedy
Heather Mitchell as Elizabeth Smith
Geoff Morrell as Allen Smith
Mia Wasikowska as Sherry Smith
Barry Otto as Merv

Release

Home media
Rogue was released on DVD in Australia on 29 May 2008. The DVD's special features include "The Making of Rogue" documentary, four featurettes, and a theatrical trailer. The US and UK DVDs feature an additional audio commentary. As  of 2013, Rogue has been released on Blu-ray in Canada and the UK. The Canadian disc features the film only, whilst the UK disc includes all of the aforementioned extras, bar the trailer.

Production
Filming took place on-location around Yellow Water Billabong, Katherine Gorge, and Arnhem Land.

Reception

Box office
Rogue debuted in the Australian box office on 11 November 2007 making . After 11 weeks in the nation's cinemas, it left making A$1.8 million. It was released in the United States on 25 April 2008 to only 10 theaters. In its first weekend, it made  and remained in theatres for four more days before exiting with a domestic total of US$10,452. As of 8 November 2009, Rogue has made A$5,984,448 worldwide.

Critical response

On the review aggregate website Rotten Tomatoes, the film has a 89% approval rating, based on 18 critic reviews, with an average rating of 7.3/10.

Melbourne's Herald Sun critic Leigh Paatsch gave the film three out of five stars stating that, "If you must see at least one killer croc movie before you die, it may as well be this polished little Australian schlocker". Sydney Morning Herald critic Sandra Hall gave the movie three and a half out of five stars writing that, "[I]t's almost elegant. Its only disadvantage is it conjures up inevitable comparisons with Jaws...a benchmark the film has no hope of achieving". Variety's Richard Kuipers praised the film as a fairly formulaic but solid B-movie with good visual effects, "regular scares[,] and a monster worth the ticket price."

Accolades

See also
 Cinema of Australia
 List of killer crocodile films
 Sweetheart
 Black Water, another 2007 Australian horror film about a killer crocodile
 Dark Age (1987), an Australian horror film about a killer crocodile, also starring John Jarratt

References

External links

2007 films
2007 horror films
2007 independent films
Films set in the Northern Territory
Films shot in the Northern Territory
Films shot in Melbourne
Australian natural horror films
Village Roadshow Pictures films
Films about crocodilians
Films directed by Greg McLean
Adventure horror films
Australian action adventure films
Australian action horror films
2000s English-language films